The 2016 Aircel Chennai Open was a 2016 ATP World Tour tennis tournament played on outdoor hard courts. It was the 21st edition of the only ATP tournament taking place in India and took place at the SDAT Tennis Stadium in Chennai, India, from 4 to 10 January 2016.

Points and prize money

Point distribution

Prize money

Singles main-draw entrants

Seeds

1 Rankings as of 28 December 2015

Other entrants
The following players received wildcards into the singles main draw:
  Karen Khachanov
  Ramkumar Ramanathan
  Andrey Rublev

The following players received entry from the qualifying draw:
  Somdev Devvarman
  Thomas Fabbiano
  Jozef Kovalík
  Ante Pavić

The following player received entry as a lucky loser:
  Alexander Kudryavtsev

Withdrawals
Before the tournament
  Yuki Bhambri →replaced by  Daniel Gimeno Traver 
  Andreas Haider-Maurer →replaced by  Austin Krajicek
  Lu Yen-hsun →replaced by  Jan-Lennard Struff
  Janko Tipsarević →replaced by  Luca Vanni
  Kevin Anderson (late withdrawal) →replaced by   Alexander Kudryavtsev

Doubles main-draw entrants

Seeds

1 Rankings as of 28 December 2015

Other entrants
The following pairs received wildcards into the doubles main draw:
  Sriram Balaji /  Ramkumar Ramanathan
  Somdev Devvarman /  Jeevan Nedunchezhiyan

The following pair received entry as alternates:
  Taro Daniel /  John Millman

Withdrawals
Before the tournament
  Guillermo García López (right calf injury)

During the tournament
  Marcel Granollers (illness)

Finals

Singles 

  Stan Wawrinka defeated  Borna Ćorić, 6–3, 7–5

Doubles 

  Oliver Marach /  Fabrice Martin defeated  Austin Krajicek /  Benoît Paire, 6–3, 7–5

References

External links 
Official website